Turned to Blue is the fifty-second and final studio album by American jazz singer Nancy Wilson. It was released in 2006 through MCG Jazz. The title track is a poem written by Maya Angelou. The album won Best Jazz Vocal Album at the 49th Annual Grammy Awards, becoming Wilson's third and final Grammy win.

Track listing

Charts

Featured performers 
Several noted performers were featured on this recording, including (but not limited to):
 Hubert Laws on flute
 Billy Taylor on piano
 Andy Narell on steelpan

Reedists 
Several reedists were featured on this recording, many of which are well-known saxophonists:

 Jimmy Heath
 Bob Mintzer
 Andy Snitzer
 Eric DeFade
 James Moody
 Tom Scott
 Sean Jones on trumpet

External links
Partial List of Grammy Award winners from USA Today

References

2006 albums
Nancy Wilson (jazz singer) albums
MCG Jazz albums
Grammy Award for Best Jazz Vocal Album
Vocal jazz albums